Catla (Labeo catla), also known as the major South Asian carp, is an economically important South Asian freshwater fish in the carp family Cyprinidae. It is native to rivers and lakes in northern India, Bangladesh, Myanmar, Nepal, and Pakistan, but has also been introduced elsewhere in South Asia and is commonly farmed.

In Nepal and neighbouring regions of India, up to Odisha, it is called Bhakura.

Catla is a fish with large and broad head, a large protruding lower jaw, and upturned mouth. It has large, greyish scales on its dorsal side and whitish on its belly.

Catla is a surface and midwater feeder. Adults feed on zooplankton using large gill rakers, but young ones on both zooplankton and phytoplankton. Catla attains sexual maturity at an average age of two years and an average weight of 2 kg.

Taxonomy

The catla was formerly listed as the only species in the genus Catla, but this was a synonym of the genus Gibelion. More recently, Catalog of Fishes has moved this species to Labeo. This species has often been confused with the giant barb (Catlocarpio siamensis) of south-east Asia as the two taxa bear an extraordinary resemblance to each other, especially in their very large heads.

Aquaculture
It is one of the most important aquacultured freshwater species in South Asia.
It is grown in polyculture ponds with other carp-like fish, particularly with the roho labeo (Labeo rohita) and mrigal carp. The reported production numbers have increased sharply during the 2000s, and were in 2012 about 2.8 million tonnes per year.

Catla is sold and consumed fresh, locally and regionally. It is transported on ice. Fish of 1–2 kg weight are preferred by consumers.

References

 Catla catla - http://en.bdfish.org/2010/02/catla-catla-catla-hamilton-1822/.BdFISH
 Menon, A.G.K. 1999 Check list - fresh water fishes of India. Rec. Zool. Surv. India, Misc. Publ., Occas. Pap. No. 175, 366 p.

Fish described in 1822
Taxa named by Francis Buchanan-Hamilton
Fish of India
Labeo
Cyprinid fish of Asia
Fish farming
Fish of Bangladesh
Taxobox binomials not recognized by IUCN